The Keystone B-5 is a light bomber made by the Keystone Aircraft company for the United States Army Air Corps in the early 1930s. The B-5A was a Keystone B-3A with Wright Cyclone rather than Pratt & Whitney engines.

Design and development
Three B-3A (LB-10A) were reengined with Wright R-1750-3 radial engines and were redesignated Y1B-5. The Army Air Corps changed the design of the last 27 LB-10As on order, replacing the Pratt & Whitney R-1690 radial engines with the Wright R-1750-3. The Pratt & Whitney-powered aircraft were designated B-3A, and the Wright-powered aircraft became B-5A. They provided the backbone of the U.S. bomber force from then to 1934.

Operational history
B-5A were first line bombers of the United States for the period between 1930 and 1934. Afterwards, they remained in service primarily as observation aircraft until the early 1940s.

Variants
LB-14
Designed as LB-10 with 575 hp (429 kW) Pratt & Whitney GR-1860 engines; three ordered, but redesigned with 525 hp (392 kW) Wright R-1750-3 engines and delivered as the Y1B-5.
Y1B-5
Three pre-production aircraft redesignated from LB-14 before delivery.
B-5A
Wright R-1750-3 version originally ordered as B-3A, 27 built

Operators

United States Army Air Corps

Specifications (B-5A)

See also

External links

USAF Museum article on B-5
USAF Museum article on LB-14

B-5
Light bombers
Keystone B-05
Biplanes
Twin piston-engined tractor aircraft